Al-Zaher Palace Museum in Makkah, Saudi Arabia, is a historical museum that exhibits the history of Makkah and various archaeological collections for different periods of Islamic history in the region and was built in an area of 2700 m2 covering two stories and surrounding gardens. It was built with an Islamic architectural style with cut and carved stone.

History 
Al-Zaher Palace was constructed in 1944 and was one of the headquarters for King Abdul Aziz in Makkah where he used to meet the delegates of Muslim pilgrims coming from different Islamic Countries. The palace has then been transformed into a museum for Islamic history in Makkah.

Museum Halls 
The museum consists of 15 halls including

 Pre-Islam Hall.
 The Kingdom's Antiquities Hall.
 The Holy Quran Hall.
 The Prophet's Biography Hall.
 Hajj Hall.
 The Holy Mosque's Architecture Hall.
 Makkah Heritage Hall.
 Islamic Civilization Exhibits Hall.

See also 

 List of museums in Saudi Arabia

References 

Museums in Saudi Arabia
Tourist attractions in Saudi Arabia
Tourist attractions in Mecca
History museums in Saudi Arabia